William Neville (December 29, 1843 – April 5, 1909) was an American Populist Party politician.

Biography
He was born in Nashville, Illinois. He moved with his parents to Chester, Illinois in 1851. Graduated from McKendree University and served as a sergeant in Company H of the 142nd regiment of the Illinois Volunteer Infantry during the American Civil War. He studied law and was admitted to the bar in 1874, and set up practice in Chester.

He was a member of the Illinois House of Representatives in 1872. He moved to Nebraska in May 1874 and moved to North Platte, Nebraska in April 1877, continuing practicing law there. He ran for election to the Forty-ninth Congress and lost in 1884. He then became a judge of the thirteenth judicial district from 1891 to 1895. He was elected as a Populist to the 56th congress (1899) to fill the vacancy caused by the death of William L. Greene, was reelected to the 57th Congress, but did not stand for reelection to the 58th.

He moved to Douglas, Arizona in 1903 and resumed practicing law. He was elected a member of the Arizona territorial house of representatives in 1905. He died in Douglas, and was buried in North Platte Cemetery, North Platte.

He was the father of Nebraska Governor Keith Neville and a cousin to Bird Segle McGuire, a U.S. Representative from Oklahoma.

References

External links
 

1843 births
1909 deaths
People from Nashville, Illinois
People's Party members of the United States House of Representatives from Nebraska
Nebraska Populists
Members of the Illinois House of Representatives
Members of the Arizona Territorial Legislature
Nebraska state court judges
People from Chester, Illinois
People of Illinois in the American Civil War
Union Army soldiers
McKendree University alumni
19th-century American politicians
People from Douglas, Arizona
19th-century American judges
Members of the United States House of Representatives from Nebraska